A hubometer (hub, center of a wheel + -ometer, measure of), or hubodometer or simply hubo, is a device mounted on the axle of an automobile or other land vehicle that measures distance traveled.

The whole device rotates with the wheel except for an eccentrically mounted weight on an internal shaft. This remains pointing downwards and drives the counting mechanism as the body of the hubometer rotates round it.

Typical uses 
They are needed on semi-trailers where they are the only means of measuring distance traveled over the lifetime of a tire or the trailer.

They are used on bus or truck or trailer wheels where the tires are supplied to the vehicle operator by an independent company on a contract of "price per thousand kilometers". The hubometer is installed by the tire company to give them their own measure.

In New Zealand hubodometers are used for the calculation of road user charges  for HGVs powered by a fuel not taxed at source.

Historical data 
At the Veeder Manufacturing Company in Hartford, Connecticut production of cyclometers, hub odometers, and other scientific tools was underway for contracts with the United States government. Designed by Curtis Veeder  in 1895, the cyclometer measured the distance traveled by bicycles as Curtis was a bicycle enthusiast. He would later adapt the invention to measure distance traveled for automobiles, hubodometers, as well as hand-turned cyclometers for use by the US Weather Bureau. The Veeder Manufacturing Company would produce these tools for use by the US government during World War One. Seen here are two different departments within the manufacturing plant in Hartford. The first shows the basic tool department which appears to be making the casings for the cyclometers. In the second picture is the hub odometer department. These devices would be placed on the wheel of an automobile to measure the distance traveled by counting the rotations of its wheels for military records (probably not for gas reimbursement, however).

Curtis Veeder would acquire the Root Company of Bristol in 1928 before retiring to form the Veeder-Root Corporation that is still in business today. With his industrial wealth, Veeder would build an elaborate stone mansion on Elizabeth Street in Hartford which is now the headquarters of the Connecticut Historical Society.

See also 
Odometer
Speedometer
Tachograph
Tachometer
Taximeter
Hobbs meter
Tach Timer

References

Vehicle technology
Measuring instruments
Length, distance, or range measuring devices